Paraona cocciniceps is a moth of the family Erebidae. It was described by Paul Mabille in 1884. It is found on Madagascar.

References

 

Lithosiina
Moths described in 1884